

Federal senators

 Aloysio Nunes - PSDB (Brazilian Social Democracy Party)
 José Serra - PSDB (Brazilian Social Democracy Party)
 Marta Suplicy - PMDB (Brazilian Democratic Movement Party)

 
Lists of Brazilian politicians